Frank Safanda (January 11, 1895 – April 24, 1948) was an American gymnast who competed in the 1924 Summer Olympics. He competed in all 9 of the gymnastic events in the 1924 games. Safanda worked in New Jersey as a machinist for the Hyatt Bearing Division of General Motors.

References

1895 births
1948 deaths
American male artistic gymnasts
Olympic gymnasts of the United States
Gymnasts at the 1924 Summer Olympics